Androcentrism (Ancient Greek, ἀνήρ, "man, male") is the practice, conscious or otherwise, of placing a masculine point of view at the center of one's world view, culture, and history, thereby culturally marginalizing femininity. The related adjective is androcentric, while the practice of placing the feminine point of view at the center is gynocentric.

Etymology 

The term androcentrism was introduced as an analytic concept by Charlotte Perkins Gilman in a scientific debate. Perkins Gilman described androcentric practices in society and the resulting problems they created in her investigation on The Man-Made World; or, Our Androcentric Culture, published in 1911. Because of this androcentrism can be understood as a societal fixation on masculinity whereby all things originate. Under androcentrism, masculinity is normative and all things outside of masculinity are defined as other. According to Perkins Gilman, masculine patterns of life and masculine mindsets claimed universality while female patterns were considered as deviance.

Education 
Some universities such as the University of Oxford consciously practiced a numerus clausus and restricted the number of female undergraduates they accepted.

Literature 
Research by Dr. David Anderson and Dr. Mykol Hamilton has documented the under-representation of female characters in a sample of 200 books that included top-selling children's books from 2001 and a seven-year sample of Caldecott award-winning books. There were nearly twice as many male main characters as female main characters, and male characters appeared in illustrations 53 percent more than female characters. Most of the plot-lines centered on the male characters and their experiences of life.

The arts 

In 1985 a group of female artists from New York, the Guerrilla Girls, began to protest the under-representation of female artists. According to them, male artists and the male viewpoint continued to dominate the visual art world. In a 1989 poster (displayed on NYC buses) titled "Do women have to be naked to get into the Met. Museum?" they reported that less than 5% of the artists in the Modern Art sections of the Met Museum were women, but 85% of the nudes were female.

Over 20 years later, women were still under-represented in the art world. In 2007, Jerry Saltz (journalist from the New York Times) criticized the Museum of Modern Art for undervaluing work by female artists. Of the 400 works of art he counted in the Museum of Modern Art, only 14 were by women (3.5%). Saltz also found a significant under-representation of female artists in the six other art institutions he studied.

Generic male language 

In literature, the use of masculine language to refer to men, women, intersex, and non-binary may indicate a male or androcentric bias in society where men are seen as the 'norm', and women, intersex, and non-binary are seen as the 'other'. Philosophy scholar Jennifer Saul argues that the use of male generic language marginalizes women, intersex, and non-binary people in society. In recent years, some writers have started to use more gender-inclusive language (for instance, using the pronouns they/them and using gender-inclusive words like humankind, person, partner, spouse, businessperson, firefighter, chairperson and police officer).

Many studies have shown that male generic language is not interpreted as truly gender-inclusive. Psychological research has shown that, in comparison to unbiased terms such as "they" and "humankind", masculine terms lead to male-biased mental imagery in the mind of both the listener and the communicator.

Three studies by Mykol Hamilton show that there is not only a male → people bias but also a people → male bias. In other words, a masculine bias remains even when people are exposed to only gender neutral language (although the bias is lessened). In two of her studies, half of the participants (after exposure to gender neutral language) had male-biased imagery but the rest of the participants displayed no gender bias at all.  In her third study, only males showed a masculine-bias (after exposure to gender neutral language) – females showed no gender bias. Hamilton asserted that this may be due to the fact that males have grown up being able to think more easily than females of "any person" as generic "he," since "he" applies to them. Further, of the two options for neutral language, neutral language that explicitly names women (e.g., "he or she") reduces androcentrism more effectively than neutral language that makes no mention of gender whatsoever (e.g., "human").

Feminist anthropologist Sally Slocum argues that there has been a longstanding male bias in anthropological thought as evidenced by terminology used when referring to society, culture, and humankind. According to Slocum, "All too often the word 'man' is used in such an ambiguous fashion that it is impossible to decide whether it refers to males or just the human species in general, including both males and females."

Men's language will be judged as the 'norm' and anything that women do linguistically will be judged negatively against this. The speech of a socially subordinate group will be interpreted as linguistically inadequate against that used by socially dominant groups. It has been found that women use more hedges and qualifiers than men. Feminine speech has been viewed as more tentative and has been deemed powerless speech. This is based on the view that masculine speech is the standard.

Generic male symbols 
On the Internet, many avatars are gender-neutral (such as an image of a smiley face). However, when an avatar is human and discernibly gendered, it usually appears to be a man.

See also

 Honorary male
 Male supremacy
 Manosphere
 Patriarchy
 Phallocentrism

References

Literature
 
 Ginzberg, Ruth (1989), "Uncovering gynocentric science", in 
 
 
 

Epistemology
Feminist philosophy
Feminist terminology
Patriarchy
Philosophy of science
Feminism and society